Rap1 GTPase-activating protein 1 is an enzyme that in humans is encoded by the RAP1GAP gene.

Interactions 

RAP1GAP has been shown to interact with MLLT4.

References

Further reading